A geodesic grid is a spatial grid based on a geodesic polyhedron or Goldberg polyhedron.

History
The earliest use of the (icosahedral) geodesic grid in geophysical modeling dates back to 1968 and the work by Sadourny, Arakawa, and Mintz and Williamson. Later work expanded on this base.

Construction
A geodesic grid is a global Earth reference that uses triangular tiles based on the subdivision of a polyhedron (usually the icosahedron, and usually a Class I subdivision) to subdivide the surface of the Earth. Such a grid does not have a straightforward relationship to latitude and longitude, but conforms to many of the main criteria for a statistically valid discrete global grid. Primarily, the cells' area and shape are generally similar, especially near the poles where many other spatial grids have singularities or heavy distortion. The popular Quaternary Triangular Mesh (QTM) falls into this category.

Geodesic grids may use the dual polyhedron of the geodesic polyhedron, which is the Goldberg polyhedron. Goldberg polyhedra are made up of hexagons and (if based on the icosahedron) 12 pentagons. One implementation that uses an icosahedron as the base polyhedron, hexagonal cells, and the Snyder equal-area projection is known as the Icosahedron Snyder Equal Area (ISEA) grid.

Applications

In biodiversity science, geodesic grids are a global extension of local discrete grids that are staked out in field studies to ensure appropriate statistical sampling and larger multi-use grids deployed at regional and national levels to develop an aggregated understanding of biodiversity. These grids translate environmental and ecological monitoring data from multiple spatial and temporal scales into assessments of current ecological condition and forecasts of risks to our natural resources. A geodesic grid allows local to global assimilation of ecologically significant information at its own level of granularity.

When modeling the weather, ocean circulation, or the climate, partial differential equations are used to describe the evolution of these systems over time. Because computer programs are used to build and work with these complex models, approximations need to be formulated into easily computable forms. Some of these numerical analysis techniques (such as finite differences) require the area of interest to be subdivided into a grid — in this case, over the shape of the Earth.

Geodesic grids can be used in video game development to model fictional worlds instead of the Earth. They are a natural analog of the hex map to a spherical surface.

Pros and cons
Pros:
 Largely isotropic.
 Resolution can be easily increased by binary division.
 Does not suffer from over sampling near the poles like more traditional rectangular longitude–latitude square grids.
 Does not result in dense linear systems like spectral methods do (see also Gaussian grid).
 No single points of contact between neighboring grid cells. Square grids and isometric grids suffer from the ambiguous problem of how to handle neighbors that only touch at a single point.
 Cells can be both minimally distorted and near-equal-area. In contrast, square grids are not equal area, while equal-area rectangular grids vary in shape from equator to poles.

Cons:
 More complicated to implement than rectangular longitude–latitude grids in computers.

See also 
 Geodesics on an ellipsoid
 Geographic coordinate system
 Grid reference
 Discrete Global Grid
 Spherical design, generalization to more than three dimensions
 Quadrilateralized spherical cube, a grid over the earth based on the cube and made of quadrilaterals instead of triangles
 Polyhedral map projection

Notes

References

External links 
 BUGS climate model page on geodesic grids
 Discrete Global Grids page at the Computer Science department at Southern Oregon University
 the PYXIS innovation Digital Earth Reference Model .
 Interpolation on spherical geodesic grids: A comparative study

Finite differences
Geodesy
Geometric data structures
Numerical climate and weather models